Seosan Air Base  is a Republic of Korea Air Force (ROKAF) base located near Seosan city in South Chungcheong Province, South Korea.

Units stationed

The base is home to the ROKAF 20th Fighter Wing (제20전투비행단), comprising:
120th Fighter Squadron flying KF-16C/D (Block52)
121st Fighter Squadron flying KF-16C/D (Block52)
123rd Fighter Squadron flying KF-16C/D (Block52)
157th Fighter Squadron flying KF-16C/D (Block52)

Accidents and incidents
18 September 1997, KF-16C #92-004 crashed due to engine failure, the pilot ejected successfully
26 February 2002, KF-16C-52 #93-4087 crashed due to an engine fire, the pilot ejected successfully
20 July 2007, KF-16D #93-117 crashed at sea on a night flight from Seosan, both crewmen were killed

References

South Korean airbases